273 (two hundred [and] seventy-three) is the natural number following 272 and preceding 274.

273 is a sphenic number, figurate number, a truncated triangular pyramid number and an idoneal number.
There are 273 different ternary trees with five nodes.

In other fields
The zero of the Celsius temperature scale is (to the nearest whole number) 273 kelvins. Thus, absolute zero (0 K) is approximately −273 °C. The freezing temperature of water and the thermodynamic temperature of the triple point of water are both approximately 0 °C or 273 K.

References

Integers